Matagami is a small town in Quebec, Canada. It is located north of Amos, on Matagami Lake, at the northern terminus of Route 109 and the start of the James Bay Road (French: Route de la Baie James).  It is enclaved within the local municipality of Eeyou Istchee James Bay Regional Government, but administratively independent of it. The town had a population of 1,526 as of the Canada 2011 Census.

History

Matagami was founded in 1963 with the development of mining in the area. Previously, it existed only as a very small prospecting camp accessible only by float plane, but after a viable mineral deposit was found in the late 1950s a permanent settlement began to be established. In 1962, the Quebec Toponomy Commission attempted to name the new community Mazenod after Charles-Joseph-Eugène de Mazenod, the founder of the Missionary Oblates of Mary Immaculate, but after a public outcry by local residents the community was named after Matagami Lake.

The name Matagami means "the confluence of waters" in the Cree language.

The first church service in Matagami was held on 17 April 1962.

Demographics 

Population trend:
 Population in 2011: 1526 (2006 to 2011 population change: −1.9%)
 Population in 2006: 1555
 Population in 2001: 1939
 2001 to 2006 population change: −19.8%
 Population in 1996: 2243
 Population in 1991: 2467

Mother tongue:
 English as first language: 1%
 French as first language: 98%
 English and French as first language: 0%
 Other as first language: 1%

Economy
The two primary employers in the city are Xstrata and Domtar. Domtar has been in Matagami since 1988 when the company bought out Bisson & Bisson.

Xstrata entered Matagami in 2006 when it acquired Falconbridge Ltd. In 2008, Xstrata put Perseverance, a zinc-copper volcanogenic massive sulfide ore deposit, into production. Perseverance has a mine life of 5.5 years. Since 1957 ten deposits, including the world class Matagami Lake deposit (25.6 million tonnes grading 8.2% Zn, 0.56% Cu, 20.91 g/t Ag, 0.41 g/t Au), have been discovered and mined out for a total of "44.4 million tonnes with a similar average grade."

Further exploration is continuing in the camp through a 50–50 joint venture agreement between Xstrata and Donner Metals. In late 2008, Donner Metals Ltd. announced that Xstrata Zinc Canada was in the process of completing a scoping study at their jointly owned Bracemac-McLeod property. It is the nearest city to the Lac Doré Vanadium Deposit.

The community is also one of the distribution points for goods and services to the James Bay Hydroelectric Project. As well, Matagami has a small tourism industry due to the popularity of fishing and hunting in northern Quebec. Hotel Matagami and motel caribou include full-service bars.

Geography
Matagami is located in the geographic centre of Quebec quite far to the west and on similar parallels to Winnipeg and Vancouver further west in Canada – all of which have milder climates to a various degree. It is several parallels north of Montreal and Quebec City and in a sparsely populated area. In terms of other parts of the world, Matagami is on the same parallel as the hot Rhine shift around Mannheim in Germany, which is more than 10 °C warmer in terms of yearly mean temperature.

Services
Policing in Matagami is done by the Surete du Quebec.

Climate
In spite of being located below the 50th parallel, Matagami has a subarctic climate (Dfc). On average around 133 days of the year do not have temperatures above freezing. The cold air is dominant with 224.4 days of the year averaging air frost. Also a full 30.5 days of the year should fall to below . Around three days in summer are warm enough to reach , indicating a very continental climate.

Geography
Nearby lakes include Lake Olga.

Media
Matagami is served by a community radio station, CHEF-FM, as well as by a rebroadcaster of Première Chaîne's CHLM-FM.

Notable people
 Marianne Limpert, won the silver medal in the 200m Individual Medley at the 1996 Summer Olympics, born in Matagami
 Lorne Stamler, former NHL Hockey Player, graduated from Galinee High School in Matagami, Quebec, in 1969

References

External links
Ville de Matagami
Xstrata Zinc Matagami
Donner Metals Ltd.
Domtar Matagami

Cities and towns in Quebec
Incorporated places in Nord-du-Québec
Jamésie